Steven Richard Little (February 19, 1956 – September 6, 1999) was an American football kicker and punter in the National Football League for the St. Louis Cardinals. He is the third-highest drafted kicker in NFL history, behind Charlie Gogolak (6th, 1966) of Princeton and Russell Erxleben (11th, 1979) of Texas. Little was drafted higher than future NFL greats Ozzie Newsome and Todd Christensen.

Little was an All-American placekicker and punter during his years at the University of Arkansas in Fayetteville. He kicked an NCAA record-tying 67-yard field goal on October 15, 1977. That record has yet to be broken; it was set by Erxleben two weeks earlier on October 1, 1977, and is shared with Joe Williams of Wichita State (October 21, 1978).

High school and college career
Little played high school football for Shawnee Mission South High School in Overland Park, Kansas, where he was an all-state quarterback and defensive back. He was recruited to play football for the University of Arkansas by legendary Arkansas head coach Frank Broyles. Broyles later said that he initially recruited Little to play quarterback since Joe Ferguson had recently graduated and entered the NFL. However Little's kicking abilities so impressed Broyles that they utilized him in that position. Also coach Bo Rein had recently accepted an assistant coaching position with Arkansas, and was bringing with him high school standout quarterback Ron Calcagni.

In 1975, Little helped Arkansas in its defeat of Georgia in the Cotton Bowl. In 1977, he earned All-America honors and kicked a still-standing NCAA D-I record 67-yard field goal against Texas on Oct. 15th. He helped the Razorbacks to an upset victory in the Orange Bowl over Oklahoma. During his final year at Arkansas Little played under head coach Lou Holtz.

Professional career
Little was selected fifteenth in the 1978 NFL Draft by the St. Louis Cardinals. Despite the anticipation surrounding his kicking skills demonstrated in college, he performed at a dismal level as a professional. Little served as both punter and placekicker; in his brief 33-game NFL career, he punted for a total of 4,809 yards, but had a disappointing field goal percentage of 48.1% over less than three seasons. He did kick a 51-yard field goal, the fifth-longest in Cardinals history, but also missed ten extra points in 51 attempts. Little's problems off the field also caused him issues with the team; with a new head coach in 1980, he was released six games into the season on October 16, replaced by kicker Neil O'Donoghue.

Hours after his release by the Cardinals, Little was involved in a high-speed single car accident, which broke his neck and left him a  Little died in 1999 at age 43, having spent years as a quadriplegic in hospice in Little Rock, Arkansas, where he lived with and was cared for by his brother Gene Little. Little is on the All-Century team at Arkansas, and is also listed as #11 on the list of greatest Arkansas football players of all time.

References

Notes

External links

1956 births
1999 deaths
All-American college football players
American football placekickers
American football punters
Arkansas Razorbacks football players
Sportspeople from Overland Park, Kansas
People with tetraplegia
Sportspeople from Little Rock, Arkansas
Sportspeople from Springfield, Illinois
St. Louis Cardinals (football) players